Ogy is a former commune in the Moselle department in Grand Est in north-eastern France. On 1 January 2017, it was merged into the new commune Ogy-Montoy-Flanville. Its population was 473 in 2019.

See also
 Communes of the Moselle department

References 

Former communes of Moselle (department)
Populated places disestablished in 2017